Srní is a municipality and village in Klatovy District in the Plzeň Region of the Czech Republic. It has about 200 inhabitants.

Administrative parts
The hamlet of Vchynice-Tetov I is an administrative part of Srní.

Etymology
The village was named Rehberg (literally "roe deer mountain") in German and later Srní (i.e. "roe deer's") after roe deers that were abundant in the area.

Geography
It lies in the Bohemian Forest and in the Šumava National Park. The rivers Křemelná and Vydra flow along the municipal borders, which then merge into the Otava River in the northeastern part of the territory.

History
Srní was founded by Baron Schmiedl in 1726 or 1727 as a lumberjack settlement.

Sights
The landmark of Srní is the Church of the Holy Trinity. It was built in 1804–1805.

An important technical monument is the Vchynice-Tetov Canal. It was constructed to float wood in 1799–1801. It joined the Křemelná and Vydra rivers to get around unnavigable section of the Vydra.

References

External links

Villages in Klatovy District
Bohemian Forest